The 1930–31 Torquay United F.C. season was Torquay United's fourth season in the Football League and their fourth consecutive season in Third Division South.  The season runs from 1 July 1930 to 30 June 1931.

Overview
After finishing no higher than 18th in their first three Football League campaigns, Torquay manager Frank Womack was determined to build a team that would make a more competitive showing in the Third Division South.  With that in mind, Womack made several impressive signings during the close season, among them Arsenal centre half Jack Butler and Leicester City keeper Joe Wright.  Finally it appeared that the Magpies had hit upon a winning formula and by early October they were second in the Third Division South table, just four points behind leaders Notts County.  Much of the upturn in Torquay's fortunes was due to the scoring prowess of new centre forward Jimmy Trotter who had already scored thirteen goals before the end of October and would go on to score a total of 28 goals in all competitions by the end of the season.  Trotter was ably assisted by two more new forwards in Billy Clayson and Albert Hutchinson, who contributed another 25 goals between them.  Hutchinson was to eventually prove a very loyal servant to Torquay, remaining with the club up until the outbreak of World War II.

However, despite their blistering start to the season, Torquay then hit upon a run of bad form towards the end of the year in which they lost six out of seven games and saw them drop to 12th position by Christmas Day.  Results began to improve again in the New Year when the talented young outside right Ralph Birkett was re-introduced into the team.  However, despite Trotter, Clayson and Hutchinson appearing to be firing on all cylinders again, it would not be enough for the Magpies to make a challenge for promotion and they would have to settle for an 11th-place finish at the end of the season.

Perhaps Torquay's mid-season slump may have been due to the distractions of the FA Cup which saw the Magpies defeat Southend United and Accrington Stanley to reach the Third Round for the first time in their history.    They were rewarded with a trip to Second Division side Bury and, far from being overawed by the occasion, Torquay came back from Gigg Lane with a 1–1 draw, earning a replay at Plainmoor.  Unfortunately, despite a battling performance from United which forced the replay into extra time, it was Bury who were to make it through to the Fourth Round.

It had been by far Torquay's most successful season to date and there was now a sense that the club was finally making progress in the Football League.  Frank Womack now had to make sure the season was not to be just a one-off but the start of something bigger and better for Torquay United.

League statistics

Third Division South

Results summary

Results by round

Match of the season
BURY 1–1 TORQUAY UNITEDFA Cup Third RoundGigg Lane, 10 January 1931 

In keeping with a season which had perhaps exceeded many expectations, Torquay United found themselves in the Third Round of the FA Cup for the very first time in their history.  Having first seen off Third Division South rivals Southend United and Accrington Stanley of the Third Division North in consecutive away 1–0 victories, the Magpies then had to make another long trip up north to face Second Division side Bury.  With the Lancashire team currently lying in 7th place in Division Two, few would have expected Torquay to have gained any kind of result when they visited Gigg Lane.

The side chosen by Frank Womack reflected the changes he had brought to the team for this season with only Bob Smith, Harry Waller and Harry Keeling having played for the Magpies during the previous campaign.  This was a notable match for Bob Smith as he was making his 100th appearance for the club, the first player to reach that landmark for Torquay United and he was, in fact, an ever-present for the Magpies this season appearing in all 46 games.  Protecting Joe Wright's goal was his namesake Jim Wright and Dick Hill while former Arsenal centre half Jack Butler was flanked in the midfield by Smith and Billy Clayson.  Clayson was unusually playing in the right half position having been replaced in his more accustomed role of inside forward by Harry Keeling in the previous match, an away trip to Gillingham.  Having scored two goals in that game, Keeling retained his position in the forward line forcing Clayson to make the switch into midfield, pushing Jim Wright into the right back position at the expense of Jack Fowler.  Taking the outside forward positions were Harry Waller and William Bell with Albert Hutchinson and potent centre forward Jimmy Trotter completing the forward line.  Perhaps unsurprisingly, it was Trotter who forced an unlikely replay by scoring his 18th goal of the season so far.

With the replay taking place at Plainmoor four days later, Trotter scored once again to take the match into extra time.  However, on this occasion the Shakers superiority prevailed and eventually won the tie 2–1 in extra time.  Ironically, Bury were knocked out in the next round by Torquay's local rivals Exeter City.  As for Torquay, it would be another seventeen years before they would reach the Third Round of the FA Cup again.

Results

Third Division South

FA Cup

Club statistics

First team appearances

Source:

Top scorers

Source:

Transfers

In

Out

Source:

References

External links

Torquay United F.C.
Torquay United F.C. seasons